Anna Nikolaevna Shatilova  (born November 26, 1938, Shihovo, Odintsovsky District, Moscow Oblast, Russian SSR, USSR) is a Soviet and Russian speaker and presenter. The announcer Central Television Broadcaster of the USSR (1962-1995). Honored Artist of the RSFSR (1978), People's Artist of the RSFSR (1988).

Known for many years a duet with Igor Kirillov.

See also
Vremya

References

External links

 Anna Shatilova Biography  // kino-teatr.ru 
 Anna Shatilova Biography // peoples.ru 
  Anna Shatilova Biography // vokrug.tv

1938 births
Recipients of the Order "For Merit to the Fatherland", 3rd class
Recipients of the Order of Honour (Russia)
Soviet television presenters
Russian television presenters
Living people
Radio and television announcers
People's Artists of the RSFSR
Honored Artists of the RSFSR
People from Odintsovsky District
Russian women television presenters
Russian radio presenters
Russian women radio presenters